Daniel Burke (26 June 1827 – 13 August 1927) was an Australian politician.

Burke was born in Thurles in County Tipperary in 1827. In 1893 he won a by-election for the Tasmanian House of Assembly seat of Cressy following Edmund Sutton's death. He served until the abolition of his seat in 1903. He died in 1927 in Moltema.

References

1827 births
1927 deaths
Members of the Tasmanian House of Assembly
Australian centenarians
Men centenarians